Gladys Henson (27 September 1897 – 21 December 1982) was an Irish actress whose career lasted from 1932 to 1976 and included roles on stage, radio, films and television series. Among her most notable films were The History of Mr Polly (1949) and The Blue Lamp (1950).

Life and career
Henson was born Gladys Hilda Barbara Kate Gunn at 4 St Stephen's Green, Dublin, Ireland, the daughter of John Gunn, the director of the Gaiety Theatre, and Hilda Killock.

She married English actor Leslie Henson in 1926 (they had a son Joe in 1932). In 1932, she appeared in the premiere of Noël Coward's Design for Living on Broadway, appearing in several other London and Broadway shows, including Coward's Set to Music (1939). After her divorce from Henson, she appeared in numerous well-known post-war films, often alongside Jack Warner, whose wife she played in both Train of Events and The Blue Lamp; the scene in the latter in which her character learns of her husband's death has been described as "a masterpiece of understated emotion, moving without falling into sentimentality."

She died in London on 21 December 1982 aged 85.

Partial filmography
Notable films and television programmes in which Henson appeared:

References

External links

1897 births
1982 deaths
Irish film actresses
20th-century Irish actresses
Actresses from Dublin (city)